The Bend Phillies were a minor league baseball team located in Bend, Oregon. The Phillies were members of the Class A Short Season Northwest League from 1979 to 1986. Prior to 1981 the team was named the Central Oregon Phillies.

History
Professional baseball returned to Bend with the expansion of the Northwest League in 1978. The franchise was named the Timber Hawks and affiliated with the Oakland Athletics. Timber Hawks owner Doug Emmans relocated the Timber Hawks south to Medford following the 1978. Upon relocating the club became the Medford Athletics as they continued their relationship with Oakland. Bend would not be without baseball long as Gene Davis obtained the rights for a new franchise. The club signed a player development contract with the Philadelphia Phillies and adopted their parent club's nickname paired with a regional moniker to be known as the Central Oregon Phillies.

The Phillies had a banner year in their inaugural season. The team posted a league best record 43-28 en route to a south division title. Central Oregon defeated north division winner Walla Walla in the league championship series 2-1 to claim the Northwest League crown.
After the 1980 season Gene Davis sold the franchise to Portland businessman Jack Cain. In addition the sale, the club changed its name from Central Oregon to Bend. Jack Cain eventually became the president of the Northwest League and in an effort to avoid a conflict of interest he transferred ownership to his wife, Mary. In 1985 owner Jack Cain had contemplated changing the nickname to "Beavers", but ultimately decided against the switch.

The Phillies were unable to match the success of their first campaign of 1979. Following the 1986 season the Philadelphia Phillies ended their affiliation with the club. The decision was largely a result of Philadelphia's desire to move its minor league teams closer to the East Coast. Like Bend, the Phillies severed ties with their Triple-A affiliate Portland of the Pacific Coast League. Professional baseball remained in Bend with the Bend Bucks beginning play as an independent team 1987 before securing a player development contract with the California Angels.

Ballpark
The Phillies played at Vince Genna Stadium located in Bend, Oregon.

Season-by-season record

Former players
Central Oregon Phillies players (1979–1980)
Bend Phillies players (1981–1986)

References

External links
 Stats Crew Central Oregon Phillies

Defunct Northwest League teams
Philadelphia Phillies minor league affiliates
Defunct baseball teams in Oregon
Professional baseball teams in Oregon
Sports in Bend, Oregon
1979 establishments in Oregon
1986 disestablishments in Oregon
Baseball teams disestablished in 1986
Baseball teams established in 1979